Annie Lilian La Fleur (née Burgess, born 3 November 1969) is an Australian-Papua New Guinean former basketball player who competed in the 2000 Summer Olympics and the WNBA from 1999 to 2003. She also played for the Sydney Flames in the WNBL, the Australian domestic competition.

WNBA career statistics

Regular season

|-
| align="left" | 1999
| align="left" | Minnesota
| 25 || 0 || 13.3 || .343 || .440 || .250 || 1.5 || 1.4 || 0.3 || 0.0 || 0.9 || 2.4
|-
| align="left" | 2001
| align="left" | Washington
| 31 || 27 || 23.6 || .333 || .298 || .593 || 2.5 || 2.8 || 0.8 || 0.1 || 1.9 || 4.0
|-
| align="left" | 2002
| align="left" | Washington
| 26 || 26 || 24.3 || .386 || .364 || .778 || 2.4 || 3.6 || 1.3 || 0.2 || 1.6 || 4.8
|-
| align="left" | 2003
| align="left" | Washington
| 34 || 33 || 24.7 || .373 || .276 || .600 || 2.3 || 3.3 || 0.8 || 0.0 || 1.5 || 3.9
|-
| align="left" | Career
| align="left" | 4 years, 2 teams
| 116 || 86 || 21.9 || .359 || .325 || .648 || 2.2 || 2.8 || 0.8 || 0.1 || 1.5 || 3.8

Playoffs

|-
| align="left" | 2002
| align="left" | Washington
| 5 || 5 || 32.0 || .379 || .250 || .667 || 3.0 || 5.4 || 0.4 || 0.0 || 2.0 || 6.0
|-
| align="left" | Career
| align="left" | 1 years, 1 team
| 5 || 5 || 32.0 || .379 || .250 || .667 || 3.0 || 5.4 || 0.4 || 0.0 || 2.0 || 6.0

See also
 List of Australian WNBA players

References

External links
 
 
 
 

1969 births
Living people
Australian expatriate basketball people in the United States
Australian women's basketball players
Papua New Guinean women's basketball players
Basketball players at the 2000 Summer Olympics
Minnesota Lynx players
Olympic basketball players of Australia
Olympic medalists in basketball
Olympic silver medalists for Australia
Washington Mystics players
Medalists at the 2000 Summer Olympics